Joan Riddell Cook (January 5, 1922 in Portland, Oregon – February 5, 1995 in New York City) was an American newspaper journalist and editor, a trade union leader, and a founding director of the Journalism and Women Symposium (JAWS).

Background
Joan Ridell Cook was a 1939 graduate of Marlborough School, a prestigious all-girls day and boarding school in the Hancock Park area of Los Angeles.

Career

Cook started her career at the Minneapolis Star Tribune. She later left and started working  at the New York Herald Tribune. Cook later worked for two years as women's editor at The Detroit News.

Cook eventually started working for The New York Times in 1959, where she worked until her retirement in 1991.  She was one of seven named plaintiffs in a class action Title VII sex discrimination lawsuit  against the Times that was filed in 1974. Cook served as head of the Times unit of the New York City Newspaper Guild labor union and was only the second woman ever elected to the post.  

Cook also served as president of the Silurians, which is the oldest press club in New York.

Cook first joined JAWS (Journalism and Women Symposium) in 1989 and became a member of the first board of directors.

Death
Cook died of breast cancer in 1995 in New York City, aged 73.

Legacy
Cook appears by name in The Girls in the Balcony: Women, Men, and the New York Times by author Nan C. Robertson and A Place in the News: From the Women's Pages to the Front Page by Kay Mills

Joan Cook Scholarship Fund
After her death, JAWS created the Joan Cook Scholarship Fund in her honor. It provides yearly grants to young women through JAWS.

References

External links
In Memory: Joan Cook

1922 births
1995 deaths
Journalists from Portland, Oregon
Star Tribune people
New York Herald Tribune people
The Detroit News people
The New York Times editors
American newspaper editors
American trade union leaders
Deaths from breast cancer
Deaths from cancer in New York (state)
Women newspaper editors
20th-century American women writers
20th-century American journalists